Anni B Sweet is the stage name of Ana Fabiola López Rodríguez (born 1987 in Málaga), a Spanish indie and folk singer-songwriter.

López has been composing songs since the age of seven and in her teenage years performed in a number of bands with her friends. In 2007, Anni started to perform as a solo artist and word of her spread among music fans through MySpace. In 2008, she was signed by Subterfuge Records, Spain's biggest independent label, with whom she released her debut album Start, Restart, Undo the following year. Anni was offered the chance to perform at the Festival Internacional de Benicàssim in 2009 before having released her album. This was followed up by a massive tour of Spain and several other countries. In October 2009 Anni's acoustic cover version of Take On Me, by A-Ha, was used on a television advert for a major fast food chain, and in 2019 it was used in Season One of the UK television show Brassic. She was also voted Artist Sensation of 2009 by El País online.

Discography

Albums 
Start, Restart, Undo (2009)
Oh, Monsters! (2012)
Chasing Illusions (2015)
Universo por Estrenar (2019)

Singles 
"Motorway"
"La La La"
"Take On Me"
"At Home"
"Getting Older"
"Ridiculous Game 2060"
"Locked In Verses"

References

External links 
 MySpace profile
 Subterfuge Records
 Anni B Sweet

1987 births
Living people
Spanish singer-songwriters
21st-century Spanish singers
21st-century Spanish women singers
English-language singers from Spain